Johan August Lindberg (3 September 1846 – 18 November 1916) was a Swedish actor, stage director and theatre manager.

Biography
Lindberg was born at Hedemora in Dalarna, Sweden. He was the son of Carl Fr. Lindberg and his wife Kristina Jansdotter.
He moved to Stockholm and first work at  the Blå porten restaurant and cafe in Djurgården. In 1865, he the Dramatens elevskola where he remain until the spring of 1866. After graduation, Lindberg was employed by the traveling theater company operated by  Carl Otto Lindmark (1830-1901).

Lindberg played at almost all of the major theatres in Sweden, including the Swedish Theatre and the Royal Dramatic Theatre in Stockholm, and several times toured the provinces with travelling theatre companies. His acting was characterized by his strange diction and his eccentric ways, and he was often mimicked, but in spite of this was considered one of the country's foremost actors.
Lindberg is most famous for his rendition of Hamlet, which he played countless times during his career, and he also played all of the other great Shakespeare parts. As a theatre manager he was among the first to introduce the plays of Henrik Ibsen in Sweden, and with his one-man interpretations of plays such as Shakespeare's The Tempest and Goethe's Faust, he toured Sweden and the United States.

Personal life
Lindberg was married to actress Augusta Lindberg (1866–1943)  and was the father of author Stina Bergman (1888–1976), director Per Lindberg (1890–1944) and Greta Lindberg (1886–1978).
He was the father-in-law of playwright  Hjalmar Bergman who was married to his daughter, Stina Bergman.

References

Other sources

External links 

20th-century Swedish male actors
Swedish theatre directors
Swedish male stage actors
1846 births
1916 deaths
People from Hedemora Municipality
19th-century Swedish male actors